Enid Beatrice Gilchrist OAM (died 17 October 2007, age 90) was an Australian fashion designer, who became well known for her numerous self-drafting sewing pattern books which were very popular in the 1950s to 1970s.

Enid studied dress design at Melbourne Technical College (now Royal Melbourne Institute of Technology) and during World War II worked as a dressmaker for a pattern firm. She worked with the Victorian Infant Welfare Department and the Kindergarten Union to produce a series of patterns for babies and young children. She later taught dress design at Footscray Technical College and the Emily Mcpherson College.

Enid began to make patterns using a pattern-drafting method. These patterns were published in The Argus from 1946 onward into the 1950s. They were also published in The News (Adelaide) in 1953. Her pattern drafting techniques were collected in books that were sold widely across Australia. The first editions sold out and they went into multiple printings. In the early 1950s she also lectured widely to suburban state school mothers clubs, church groups and Red Cross auxiliaries in Melbourne, featuring the clothes that she designed and using local children as models. She later joined New Idea magazine, where she published articles and patterns and produced sewing books showing clothes which people could make up from the pattern drafts.

In 1953 she was one of the judges of a competition for wool fashions with a parade of the finalists run by the Royal Melbourne Show.

While her books were published without dates, they can be grouped by reference to the decimalization of Australian currency in 1966, demonstrated by the price on the cover.

Earliest Publications
No. 1 Clothes for Your Baby
No. 2 Toddlers' Clothes
No. 3 Pre-school Clothes (3-4 Years)
No. 4 Betweens (4-6 Years)
No. 5 Sixes and Sevens
No. 6 Boys and Girls (8-10 Years)
No. 7 Dresses for your Daughter

Publications before 1966
Clothes for Your Children
Baby Book
Toddlers' Wardrobe
Three to Six
Play Clothes
Little Coats and Dresses (0-6 Years)
Six to Nine Years
Suits and Dresses (5-12 Years)
Boy and Girl Clothes
Undies, Beach and Sleep Wear
Junior Teens and Smaller Women
Women and Teenagers
Basic Fashion for Women
Doll's Clothes

Publications Circa 1966
Teenagers and Small Women
Under Five Fashion
150 Fancy Dress Ideas
Teen Dolls
Pinnies and Things
Sleep Wear and Undies
3 to 6
Maternity Wear
Casual Clothes (6-15 Years)

Publications Post 1966
Seventy Styles from the Basic Pattern
Fancy Dress
Boys and Girls (5-9 Years)
Over-20 Styles
Girls' Gear (5-12 Years)
Ten to Teens (10-15 Years)
Kindergarten Set (3-6 Years)
Home Maker Book
Smocks and Maternity Wear
Mix'n'Match: For Girls and Boys 5-9 Years

Sources
Enid Gilchrist (nd) Sewing is Simple with Enid Gilchrist: 29 Great Designs for Children: A New Idea Special Publication
Enid Gilchrist (nd) Dresses for your Daughter: Enid Gilchrist Pattern Book No. 7
Enid Gilchrist (nd, pre-1966) Six to Nine Years: Boy and Girl Clothes
Enid Gilchrist (nd, circa 1966) Teenagers and Small Women
Enid Gilchrist (nd, post-1966) Seventy Styles from the Basic Pattern: Bust Sizes 34-44

References

External links
Enid Gilchrist Pattern Book at the Powerhouse Museum

Year of birth missing
1910s births
2007 deaths
Australian fashion designers
Australian women fashion designers
Recipients of the Medal of the Order of Australia